William Dovers may refer to:
William Anthony George Dovers (born 1951), Australian Rear Admiral 
William John Dovers (born 1918), Australian Rear Admiral, Deputy Chief of Navy (Australia) ca. 1973